This list includes the names of people who have received the Order of Jamaica, sorted alphabetically by last name, along with the year in which they were honoured. Members of the Order of Jamaica are entitled to be styled "The Honourable" and have the post-nominal letters 'O.J.' and 'O.J. (Hon.)', as appropriate.

References

External links 

 amaica/ "Members of the Order of Jamaica", Jamaica Information Service. Retrieved 12 May 2015.
Order of Jamaica, Office of the Prime Minister. Retrieved 19 April 2016.

Civil awards and decorations of Jamaica
Members of the Order of Jamaica